Rehabilitation or Rehab may refer to:

Health
 Rehabilitation (neuropsychology), therapy to regain or improve neurocognitive function that has been lost or diminished
 Rehabilitation (wildlife), treatment of injured wildlife so they can be returned to the wild
 Rehabilitation hospital, hospitals devoted to the rehabilitation of patients with various neurological, musculo-skeletal, orthopedic and other medical conditions.
 Drug rehabilitation, medical or psychotherapeutic treatment for dependency on substances such as alcohol and drugs
 Occupational rehabilitation, therapy to return injured workers to an appropriate level of work activity
 Physical medicine and rehabilitation, a branch of medicine that aims to enhance and restore functional ability to those with physical impairments or disabilities
 Physical therapy, physical rehabilitation using mechanical force and movement
 Psychiatric rehabilitation, a branch of psychiatry dealing with restoration of mental health and life skills after mental illness
 Vision rehabilitation, rehabilitation to improve vision or low vision
 Vocational rehabilitation, process which enables persons with impairments or disabilities to maintain or return to employment or occupation

Music
 Rehab (band), a rock band from Georgia, US
 Rehab (DJ) or R3hab, Dutch DJ 
 Rehab (Quiet Riot album), 2006 heavy metal album
 Rehab (Lecrae album), 2010 Christian hip hop album
 "Rehab" (Amy Winehouse song), 2006 song from the album Back to Black
 "Rehab" (Rihanna song), 2007 song from the album Good Girl Gone Bad
 The Rehab, a 2010 album by Young Buck

People
 Rehab Bassam (born 1977), Egyptian blogger
 Rehab Nazzal, Palestinian-born multidisciplinary artist based in Canada

Other uses
 Rehabilitation (penology), re-integration into society of a convicted person 
 Political rehabilitation, the process by which a disgraced political actor is restored to public life
 Rehabilitation (Soviet), the restoration of a person who was criminally prosecuted without due basis
 "Rehab" (The Assistants episode), 2009 television episode
 Rehab (party), a weekly summer outdoor party in Las Vegas
 Rehab: Party at the Hard Rock Hotel, a reality TV show about the party
 El Rehab, a community within New Cairo, Egypt
 Land rehabilitation, the process of restoring land after some process has damaged it
 Rehabbing housing, see Renovation

See also
 Corrections
 Habilitation, a qualification required in order to conduct self-contained university teaching in some countries
 Rahab (disambiguation)
 
 
 

de:Reha
pl:Rehab
pt:Rehab
fi:Rehab